Octalactone may refer to:

 α-Octalactone
 β-Octalactone
 γ-Octalactone
 δ-Octalactone